Wolfgang Bötsch (8 September 1938 in Bad Kreuznach – 14 October 2017 in Würzburg) was a German politician, representative of the Christian Social Union in Bavaria (CSU). Between 1974 and 1976 he represented the Landtag of Bavaria. From 1976 to 2005 he was a member of the Bundestag, and between 1993 and 1997 he was the last Minister of Post and Telecommunications. Bötsch died on 14 October 2017 at the age of 79.

See also
List of Bavarian Christian Social Union politicians

References

1938 births
2017 deaths
Christian Social Union in Bavaria politicians
Grand Crosses with Star and Sash of the Order of Merit of the Federal Republic of Germany
Members of the Bundestag 2002–2005
Members of the Bundestag 1998–2002
Members of the Bundestag 1994–1998
Members of the Bundestag 1990–1994
Members of the Bundestag for Bavaria
People from Bad Kreuznach